George Traill (5 November 1787 – 29 September 1871) was a Liberal Party politician in Scotland.
He was the son of James and Janet Sinclair Traill.

Political carear
He was the member of parliament (MP) for Orkney and Shetland from 1830 until his defeat at the 1835 general election.

In 1837 he stood unsuccessfully in Caithness, but at the 1841 general election he was returned unopposed for that seat. He was re-elected at the six further general elections, and held the seat until he resigned from the House of Commons on 8 August 1869 by becoming Steward of the Manor of Northstead.

References

External links 

1788 births
1871 deaths
Scottish Liberal Party MPs
Members of the Parliament of the United Kingdom for Highland constituencies
UK MPs 1830–1831
UK MPs 1831–1832
UK MPs 1832–1835
UK MPs 1841–1847
UK MPs 1847–1852
UK MPs 1852–1857
UK MPs 1857–1859
UK MPs 1859–1865
UK MPs 1865–1868
UK MPs 1868–1874
Members of the Parliament of the United Kingdom for Orkney and Shetland